Driving Towards the Daylight is the tenth studio album by blues rock guitarist Joe Bonamassa, released on May 22, 2012. Recorded at The Village Recorder in Los Angeles, CA and Studio at the Palms in Las Vegas, NV, Driving Towards the Daylight is a balanced and "back-to-basics album that highlights Bonamassa’s signature style of blues, roots, and rock & roll". Driving Towards the Daylight was produced by Kevin "Caveman" Shirley (Black Crowes, Aerosmith, Led Zeppelin), making this Bonamassa and Shirley's seventh album collaboration in six years.

Track listing

 — erroneously listed as a Joe Bonamassa composition in the Driving Towards the Daylight CD booklet.

Personnel

Musicians
Joe Bonamassa – guitar (all tracks), vocals (all tracks except 11), Dobro (track 1), mandolin (track 8), backing vocals (track 11)
Anton Fig – drums and percussion (all tracks)
Arlan Schierbaum – organ (all tracks except 2), piano (tracks 2, 3, 7, 10 and 11)
Kevin Shirley – guitar (tracks 2 and 6), tambourine (tracks 4 and 7), toy piano (track 1), cowbell (track 10), percussion (track 11)
Brad Whitford – guitar (tracks 1–4, 7, 9 and 11)
Michael Rhodes – bass (tracks 1–4, 7, 9 and 11)
Doug Henthorn – backing vocals (tracks 1, 3, 8, 10 and 11)
Carmine Rojas – bass (tracks 5, 6, 8 and 10)
Blondie Chaplin – guitar (tracks 5, 6 and 8)

Additional musicians
Harrison Whitford – guitar (track 3)
Jeff Bova and The Bovaland Brass – horns (track 6)
Pat Thrall – guitar (track 7)
Jimmy Barnes – vocals (track 11)

Production
Kevin Shirley – producer, mixing.
Mark Gray – engineering (tracks 1, 2, 3, 4, 7, 9 and 11)
Chris Owens – engineering (tracks 5, 6, 8 and 10)
Jared Kvitka – additional engineering
Leon Zervos – mastering
Marcus Bird – photography and direction
Dennis Friel – design, illustrations
Rick Gould – photographer

Chart performance 
The album debuted at number 2 in the UK. This constitutes the highest performance to date of a Joe Bonamassa album on a non-blues- or rock-specific chart. In Canada, the album debuted at number 55. In the U.S. the album debuted at number 1 on the Blues albums chart and number 23 on the Billboard 200.

References 

Joe Bonamassa albums
2012 albums
Albums produced by Kevin Shirley